Orak Island is an Aegean island in Turkey

There is a light house on the island. It is a part of Bodrum ilçe (district) of Muğla Province. There are olive grooves on the uninhabited island. The cape at the south coast is known as an ideal  place for underwater sports.

References

Uninhabited islands of Turkey
Islands of Muğla Province
Aegean islands
Bodrum District
Islands of Turkey